Cougar is an unincorporated community and former town in Cowlitz County, Washington. The population of Cougar was 122 at the 1990 Census, when it was still incorporated as a town, but disincorporated before the 2000 Census. As of 2020, the population is 93. The Cougar community is part of the Woodland School District, a K-12 school district of about 2,200 students. Cougar is the nearest community to Mount St. Helens, which lies 13 miles (20.9215 km) to its northeast. The eruption of Mount St. Helens on May 18, 1980 was the deadliest and most economically destructive volcanic event in the history of the United States.

A post office called Cougar was established in 1902. The community was named after the cougar.

Geography
Cougar is located at  (46.0514993, -122.2995413).

A notable Cougar resident is Gary Bennett, former Arista Records recording artist and founding member of the country band BR549.

Education
Cougar is in the territory of Woodland Public Schools, which operates Woodland High School.

External links
Woodland Public Schools website
Hotel Bar Restaurant website

References

Unincorporated communities in Cowlitz County, Washington
Unincorporated communities in Washington (state)